Pakistanis in Yemen comprise Pakistani people who live in Yemen and people born in Yemen of Pakistani descent. There are around 1,000 Pakistanis in Yemen while there are up to 110 Pakistani prisoners in Yemeni prisons for various offenses

The Houthi rebels are reported to have Pakistani fighters in their ranks.

Notable people 
Ammar al-Baluchi
Samir Khan (1985 – 2011)
Rizwan Khan

See also
Evacuation of Pakistani citizens during the Yemeni Civil War (2015)
Yemenis in Pakistan
Human trafficking in Yemen

References

External links 
Eurasia Review: Yemen seizes Iranian ship with Pakistani sailors
: 40 young Pakistanis Stuck Off In Yemen Sea in Scoop.co.nz (and the efforts of Ansar Burney to rescue them)

Yemen
Ethnic groups in Yemen
 
Pakistani expatriates in Yemen